Count Arthur Strong is a BBC sitcom written by Steve Delaney and Graham Linehan. Delaney portrays the title character in the series, a stage creation of Delaney's who has also featured in the BBC Radio 4 programme Count Arthur Strong's Radio Show! 

On 8 August 2017, the BBC announced that the show had been cancelled after three series.

Plot
The series begins with the meeting of Count Arthur Strong, an eccentric, septuagenarian, former music hall performer, with Michael Baker, the bookish son of his former comedy partner.

The television project heralds a new chapter in the life of Count Arthur Strong as compared to the character in the radio series: none of the characters from the radio programme are featured (Geoffrey, Wilf Taylor, Sally Marsden etc) and the series is set in London in and around Arthur's home and his local café rather than in Doncaster. The café is run by its belligerent Turkish owner Bulent who is helped by his sister Sinem; the other main characters are the regular pension-age customers at the cafe.

Cast
 Steve Delaney as Count Arthur Strong, an elderly, pompous, out-of-work actor from Doncaster with delusions that he is a show-business legend. The character has been described as "a mixture of physical and mental clumsiness, mirthful malapropisms and Tourettic tics, whose pride forbids him from ever conceding fallibility, even as his world crashes around him".
 Rory Kinnear as Michael Baker, a writer. Michael, a shy, bookish, often childlike, effeminate and pathetic man, is using Arthur's anecdotes to help write his late father's biography.
 Chris Ryman as Bulent, the irascible, hot-tempered owner of Arthur's local café, who is constantly irritated by Arthur's bumbling.
 Zahra Ahmadi as Sinem, Bulent's younger sister with a mischievous sense of humour.
 Andy Linden as John the Watch, an enigmatic regular at the café and close friend of Arthur's.
 Dave Plimmer as Eggy, a quiet, gentle, melancholy café regular obsessed with the supposed evils of eggs and other conspiracy theories.
 Ruth Posner as Katya, a café regular and Arthur's greatest fan. (Series 1)
 Bronagh Gallagher as Birdy, a café regular (Series 3)

Production
In 2009, it was reported that Delaney would be working on making a television version of Count Arthur Strong's Radio Show! for Talkback Thames and BBC Two, and further that Graham Linehan and Jeremy Dyson were working on a project for TV called Count Arthur Strong's Entertainment Game. The quiz show format was subsequently dropped in favour of a sitcom.

The series was recorded in front of a live audience from January to February 2013 at Pinewood Studios. The first episode of Count Arthur Strong was recorded on 10 January 2013 at Pinewood Studios. Written by Steve Delaney and Graham Linehan, it co-starred Rory Kinnear as the son of the recently deceased Max Baker, Count Arthur's erstwhile comedy partner. Michael Baker (Kinnear) sets out to track down Count Arthur after the death of his father in order to write a biography.

Episodes

Series overview

Series 1 (2013)

The first series was shown on BBC Two.

Series 2 (2015)
The second series of Count Arthur Strong sees a shift to BBC One and a later time slot of 10:35pm.

Series 3 (2017)
The third series started on 19 May 2017 on BBC One, at the earlier timeslot of 8:30 p.m. Broadcasts were delayed in the first half of June due to the 2017 UK election and moved to BBC Two due to Wimbledon, while the episode "Safari Park" was pushed to the end of the series' broadcast due to the death of a zookeeper in late May.

Broadcast history
The first episode of six was broadcast on BBC Two on 8 July 2013, with one episode each week airing thereafter. The first episode was watched by 971,000 viewers, less than half of BBC Two's slot average over the previous three months. Episodes 4, 5 and 6 were subsequently moved from Mondays, 8.30 pm, on BBC Two, to Tuesdays, 8 pm, on the same channel.

The second series aired on BBC One rather than BBC Two. The series was recorded at Pinewood Studios between 6 June 2014 and 18 July 2014. The second series began broadcasting on BBC One on 6 January 2015.

The third and final series was recorded at Pinewood Studios in August 2016. It was due for broadcast later that same year, but was pushed back to 2017.

Reception

Awards
The first series of Count Arthur Strong was nominated for three British Comedy Awards – Best Sitcom, Best New Comedy and Steve Delaney being nominated for Best Comedy Breakthrough Artist. Steve Delaney and Graham Linehan were nominated as Best Comedy Writers at the 2014 BAFTA Craft Awards and the show was also nominated for Best Situation Comedy at the 2014 BAFTA awards.

Home media
The first series of Count Arthur Strong was released on 19 August 2013. In September 2013, BBC WorldWide recalled all the DVDs due to a picture fault. Series two of Count Arthur Strong was released on DVD by Network on 26 September 2016. Series 3 was released by Network on DVD on 17 July 2017 with a Complete Series 1-3 Boxset released by Network on 26 February 2018.

References

External links
 
 
 
 

2013 British television series debuts
2017 British television series endings
2010s British sitcoms
BBC high definition shows
BBC television sitcoms
English-language television shows
Television series about actors
Television series based on radio series
Television series by Fremantle (company)
Television series created by Graham Linehan
Television series set in restaurants
Television shows set in London